Alter is both a surname and a given name. German and Jewish (Ashkenazic): distinguishing epithet for the older of two bearers of the same personal name. This was in part an omen name, expressing the parents’ hope that the child would live a long life; in part an apotropaic name, given to a child born after the death of a sibling, but also said to have sometimes been assumed by someone who was seriously ill. The purpose is supposed to have been to confuse the Angel of Death into thinking that the person was old and thus not worth claiming as a victim.

Notable people with the name include:

Surname 
Avraham Mordechai Alter (1866–1948), Hasidic rabbi
David Alter (1807–1881), American inventor
Dinsmore Alter (1888–1968), American astronomer and meteorologist
Gary Alter, American plastic surgeon
Harvey Alter, American virologist
Hobart Alter (1933–2014), American businessman
Israel Alter (also: Yisraʾel Alter, 1901–1979), Jewish composer and last chief cantor in Hanover, Germany
Jonathan Alter, American journalist
Karl Joseph Alter, American prelate of the Roman Catholic Church
Louis Alter, American composer
Michael Alter, American businessman
Moshe Jacob Alter, Yiddish poet
Pinchas Menachem Alter, Hassidic rabbi
Robert Alter, Biblical scholar
Stephen Alter, American author
Simchah Bunim Alter, Hassidic rabbi
Tom Alter, Indian actor
Yaakov Aryeh Alter, Hassidic rabbi
Yehudah Aryeh Leib Alter, Hassidic rabbi
Yisrael Alter, Hassidic rabbi
Yitzchak Meir Alter (c. 1798 – 1866), Hassidic rabbi

Given name 
Alter Kacyzne (1885–1941), Yiddish writer
Alter Levin (1883–1933), Hebrew writer and poet
Alter Tepliker (died 1919), Breslover Hasid and author
Alter Tsypkin (1891–1985), Soviet legal scholar

See also
Alter Rebbe, nickname of Shneur Zalman of Liadi
The Alter of Slabodka (Nosson Tzvi Finkel)
The Alter of Kelm
The Alter of Novardok